Rock Python (M'Gula) is a fictional character, a supervillain appearing in American comic books published by Marvel Comics. The character is usually depicted as a member of the Serpent Society. He first appeared in Captain America vol. 1 #341 in May 1988, created by writer Mark Gruenwald and artist Kieron Dwyer. He has super hard bones, skin and muscles, and uses specially designed hand grenades that entangle his opponents in steel ribbons.

He was first introduced as a henchman of Viper as she took control of the Serpent Society, deposing Sidewinder as the leader of the Society. Viper's ploy to take control of the United States was foiled by Captain America and members of the Society still loyal to Sidewinder. Rock Python was allowed to remain with the Society after Viper was defeated. He became a member of Serpent Solutions when the Society was reorganized.

Publication history

Rock Python first appeared in Captain America vol. 1 #341 in May 1988, created by writer Mark Gruenwald and artist Kieron Dwyer.

Fictional character biography
M'Gula was born in Viceroy, Rudyarda, South Africa. As Rock Python he first joined the Serpent Society when the villainous Viper invaded, and battled Nomad. After she abandoned them, he took a test to prove his worthiness of being in the Society; he tried to steal Falcon's uniform, but wound up battling Falcon and Battlestar instead. He also later battled the X-Men's Rogue, Havok, and Colossus with the rest of the Serpent Society, but quickly surrendered when he realized his opponents were much more powerful than him. He battled Captain America later. His greatest accomplishment was nearly killing Captain America after he, Anaconda, and Puff Adder were attacked. He dropped him from a rooftop, but was ordered by King Cobra to flee so as to not have their base revealed. He, along with Anaconda and Puff Adder, attacked Bad girls INC and was successful in capturing them, only to be attacked and thrown from their craft by MODAM. He and Puff Adder survive, but are injured.

Subsequently, M'Gula has also appeared with the Serpent Society as they battled Jack Flag, but was defeated by Force Works. He was next seen with the organization as they captured Diamondback and Captain America, intending to hold them for ransom.  The pair soon escaped and, in the ensuing battle, Rock Python was defeated.

He appeared in "Brand New Day" as one of the villains in the bar.

As part of the "All-New, All-Different Marvel," Rock Python appears as a member of Viper's Serpent Society under its new name of Serpent Solutions.

In a prelude to the "Hunted" storyline, several members of the Serpent Society were captured by Kraven the Hunter, Taskmaster, and Black Ant, and forced to participate in a murderous hunt set up by Arcade. Black Mamba, Cottonmouth, Bushmaster, Black Racer, Puff Adder, Rock Python, and Fer-de-Lance were placed in electric cages to wait for the hunt to commence.

Powers and abilities
Rock Python has skin, muscle and bones that are rock-hard, much like a rock python snake. He is impervious to high-caliber arms fire, powerful explosions, intense heat and deadly impacts.

References

External links
 Rock Python at Marvel.com
 

Characters created by Mark Gruenwald
Comics characters introduced in 1988
Marvel Comics mutants
Marvel Comics mutates
Marvel Comics supervillains